Charles Gordon Carroll III (February 2, 1928 – September 20, 2005) was an American film producer. He is known for his work on Alien franchise (1979–1997). He died on September 20, 2005, in Los Angeles, California. He also co-founded Brandywine Productions with David Giler and Walter Hill, a film company most famously associated with the Alien film series.

Early life and career
Carroll was raised in New York City where he was influenced by his father's love of literature. He received his education from Princeton University in advertising  and after military duty as a first lieutenant in the Korean War, he returned to Manhattan and entered the advertising world at Foote, Cone & Belding. He began his film career in 1965 as executive producer of How to Murder Your Wife. From there he went on to produce films like Cool Hand Luke (1967), Blue Thunder (1983) and Red Heat (1988).

Death 
Carrol died of heart attack on September 20, 2005 in Los Angeles, California, U.S at the age of 77. His body was cremated and his ashes were given to his family

Filmography
He was producer for all films unless otherwise noted.

Film

Miscellaneous crew

References

External links
 

1928 births
2005 deaths
United States Army personnel of the Korean War
American film producers
Businesspeople from Baltimore
Businesspeople from New York City
Princeton University alumni
20th-century American businesspeople